Michael Gerard Walsh (September 8, 1906 – August 16, 1993) was an Irish Steeplechase trainer and founder of the Stoneybrook steeplechase in Southern Pines, North Carolina. Uncle of hall of fame jockey Thomas M. Walsh

Personal life

He was born in Kildorrery, Co. Cork, Ireland on September 8, 1906 To Thomas and Regina Walsh, owners of the Walsh Corner House Pub in Kildorrery. Walsh immigrated from Ireland to the United States in 1925 after a falling out with his father, Thomas. He died on August 16, 1993 at his home in Southern Pines after a 50 year career in the horse industry. Walsh is also related to famed Irish horse trainer Ted Walsh and his son, National Hunt Champion Ruby Walsh

He is a member of the 1997 class of inductees to the National Museum of Racing and Hall of Fame.

List of achievements

Trainer of Steeplechase champion King Commander, 1954
Leading race-winning steeplechase trainer, 1953–55
Leading money-winning steeplechase trainer, 1953–54 and 1960
Third steeplechase trainer to win $1 million
Founder of the Stoneybrook Races in Southern Pines, N.C.
F. Ambrose Clark Award 
Inducted into national horse racing hall of fame 1997, saratoga springs ny
1977 inducted into north carolina sports hall of fame
1995 inducted into show horse hall of fame { only one in racing and show hall of fames}

References

http://www.racingmuseum.org/hall/trainer.asp?ID=299

Irish racehorse trainers
1993 deaths
1906 births
People from County Cork
People from Southern Pines, North Carolina
American racehorse trainers